The National Confederation of the Trade-Union Organizations of Ukraine (NKPU) is a national trade union center in Ukraine. It was founded November 26, 2004 and claims a membership of 1.5 million.

The NKPU was formed as a breakaway union from the Federation of Trade Unions of Ukraine.

See also

 Federation of Trade Unions of Ukraine
 Confederation of Free Trade Unions of Ukraine

References

Breakaway trade unions
National trade union centers of Ukraine
Trade unions established in 2004